is a Japanese professional cyclist, who currently rides for UCI Continental team .

Career 
After three years at Japanese UCI Continental team , Oka signed with French UCI ProTeam  in 2020, joining compatriots Fumiyuki Beppu, Masahiro Ishigami, and Hideto Nakane. Oka made his debut for the team at the 2020 La Tropicale Amissa Bongo.

At the end of the 2020 season, it was reported that Oka was one of several riders who filed complaints to the UCI about team manager Philippe Lannes trying to force them out of the team midway through their contracts and evict them out of the team house, amidst controversies over "missing payments, contracts not being honored, and threatening behavior" towards the riders' futures on the team. Speculation arose that Lannes' actions, especially towards Oka and Ishigami, partially stemmed from his frustrations over Japanese sponsor Nippo leaving the team, further contributing to the team's financial troubles; however, both riders remained registered with team for the 2021 season.

On 28 April 2021, Oka received a four-month suspension from the UCI after an anti-doping control test came back positive for acetazolamide, a drug banned by WADA that is often used to treat altitude sickness. Given the retroactive suspension from the date of the positive on 13 December 2020, Oka was eligible to race again on 24 May 2021.

Personal life 
Oka's older brother Yasumasa is also a professional cyclist.

Major results 

2013
 1st  Time trial, National Junior Road Championships
 2nd Road race, National Junior Road Championships
2014
 5th Time trial, National Road Championships
2015
 7th Time trial, National Road Championships
2016
 2nd Time trial, National Under–23 Road Championships
2017
 4th Time trial, National Road Championships
 6th Overall Tour de Tochigi
2018
 4th Oita Urban Classic
 9th Overall Tour de Tochigi
 10th Tour de Okinawa
2019
 1st Prologue Tour of Japan
 2nd Time trial, National Road Championships
 2nd Overall Tour de Kumano
 4th Overall Tour de Tochigi
2021
 National Road Championships
 4th Time trial
 5th Road race
2022
 1st Stage 3 Tour of Japan
 4th Umag Trophy

References

External links 
 
 

1995 births
Living people
Japanese male cyclists
Sportspeople from Ibaraki Prefecture
Doping cases in cycling
21st-century Japanese people